Our Twisted Hero is a 1992 South Korean film directed by Park Jong-won. It was chosen as Best Film at the Chunsa Film Art Awards. It is based on the short novel Our Twisted Hero by Yi Munyol.

Synopsis
A man traveling to the funeral of his fifth-grade teacher recalls his life at the time. As a city boy transferred to a country school, he encountered an unexpectedly old-fashioned hierarchical bullying system. When he tried to create a rebellion against the system, both those oppressed by it and the teachers and parents opposed him. When change finally came to the school, it was in an equally harsh form.

Cast
 Hong Kyung-in: Eom Seok-dae
 Go Jeong-il: Han Byeong-tae
 Choi Min-sik: Teacher Kim
 Shin Goo: Teacher Choi
 Shin Cheol-jin: Kim Young-pal	
 Lee Jin-seon: Woman teacher
 U Sang-jeon: Byeong-tae's father
 Kim Hye-ok: Byeong-tae's mother
 Jeong Un-bong: Kyo-gam
 Park Kwang-jin: Old teacher

Bibliography

English

Korean

Contemporary reviews
 "「우리들의 일그러진 영웅」/한국영화 첫 아랍수출" (1992-09-28). Kukmin Ilbo

Notes

1992 films
Best Picture Blue Dragon Film Award winners
1990s Korean-language films
South Korean drama films
Grand Prize Paeksang Arts Award (Film) winners